Sam Belsito (born July 16, 1942) is an American politician who served in the Connecticut House of Representatives from the 53rd district from 2013 to 2019.

References

1942 births
Living people
Republican Party members of the Connecticut House of Representatives